Thiruvengaivasal is a village in the Annavasal revenue block of Pudukkottai district, Tamil Nadu, India.

Demographics 

As per the 2001 census, Thiruvengaivasal had a total population of 1465 with 762 males and 703 females. Out of the total population 649    people were literate.

References

Villages in Pudukkottai district